The Vandive family (or Van Dievoet called Vandive; in French: Van Dievoet dit Vandive) was a Parisian and elder branch of the Van Dievoet family from Brussels, descended from goldsmith Philippe Van Dievoet, the brother of famous Brussels sculptor Peter Van Dievoet. The family were first bourgeois of Paris before becoming part of the French nobility.

This Parisian branch of the Van Dievoet family became extinct in 1802 with the death of François Gilles Vandive.

Name 
Depending on the source, the name of Philippe Van Dievoet was changed to Vandive either by the Dauphin of whom he had been the jeweller, or by his father, King Louis XIV. Before that, it was briefly written as Vandivout, in an attempt to franchise the name.

Members 

 "Sire" Philippe van Dievoet called Vandive, écuyer (1654-1738), councillor to the king, goldsmith of King Louis XIV and consul of Paris.
Guillaume Vandive, (1680-1706), printer of the Dauphin.
"Sire" Balthazar Philippe Vandive, goldsmith and consul of Paris
Nicolas Félix Vandive, écuyer, lawyer at the Parlement de Paris, Clerk of the Hearing at the King's Council, Secretary-Advisor to King House and Crown of France.

Ennoblements
Two of its members benefitted from personal and/or hereditary ennoblements due to their functions and offices.

 1680 : personal nobility with the title of écuyer for the goldsmith Philippe van Dievoet called Vandive, councillor to the King, due to his position as an officer of the Garde-Robe of the King from 1680 until 1711.
 1743 : hereditary nobility for Nicolas Félix Vandive,  clerk of the Grand Conseil, sworn in on 26 April 1743, which granted him hereditary nobility as of 1763 after a service of 20 years (principle of nobility of 1743)
 1771 : the same Nicolas Félix van Dievoet called Vandive also held the ennobling office of advisor-notary-secretary of the king.

Heraldry

Historically allied families

  Martinot family
 Beau de la Passutière

Notes

Further reading

 Alfred Détrez, « Aristocrates et joailliers sous l'ancien régime », in : La Revue(ancienne Revue des Revues), volume 78, Paris, 1908, p. 471: « aux grandes fortunes des Delahoquette, des Vandive, des Granchez »
 Édouard Van Dievoet, « Van Dive, joaillier du Dauphin », in : L’Intermédiaire des Chercheurs et Curieux, Paris, March 1953, col. 100.
 Alfred Marie, Jeanne Marie, "Mansart à Versailles", in Versailles son histoire, volume 2, 1972, p. 635 (written as Vandivout).
 Yvonne Brunel, Marie-Adélaïde de Savoie, duchesse de Bourgogne, 1685-1712, foreword by Pierre Breillat, conservateur en chef à la Bibliothèque de la Ville de Versailles, Paris, Beauchesne, 1974, p. 59 et 253.
 Alain Van Dievoet, « Un disciple belge de Grinling Gibbons, le sculpteur Pierre van Dievoet (1661-1729) et son œuvre à Londres et Bruxelles », in Le Folklore Brabançon, March 1980, n° 225, pp. 65–91.
 André Monteyne, Les Bruxellois, un passé peu ordinaire, Brussels, Vander editions, 1982, p. 109.
 Alain Van Dievoet, « Van Dive, joaillier du Dauphin », in : L'intermédiaire des chercheurs et curieux : mensuel de questions et réponses sur tous sujets et toutes curiosités, Paris, n° 470, 1990, columns 645–650.
 Michèle Bimbenet-Privat, Les orfèvres et l’orfèvrerie de Paris au xviie siècle, Paris, 2002, 2 vol., passim.
 Alain Van Dievoet, « Une famille d'orfèvres d'origine bruxelloise à Paris : les VAN DIEVOET dits VANDIVE », in : Généalogie en Yvelines, n°66, December 2003
 Pierre Le Roy et Paul Micio, Statuts et privilèges du corps des marchands orfevres-joyailliers de la ville de Paris: an 18th-century compendium of the laws governing silversmithing in Paris, published by J. Paul Getty Museum in association with the New York Public Library, 2003.
Mathieu da Vinha, Les Valets de chambre de Louis XIV, Paris, 2004, concernant la charge d'Officier de la Garde Robe du roi et les Martinot.
 Alain Van Dievoet, « Quand le savoir-faire des orfèvres bruxellois brillait à Versailles », in : Cahiers bruxellois, Bruxelles, 2004, pp. 19–66.
 Nicolas Lylon-Caen, "Labrüe au paradis, Chapeau aux enfers. Les notables de Saint-Germain-l'Auxerrois face à leurs curés au xviiie siècle", Revue d'Histoire de l'Église de France, Éditeur Brepols, volume 92, n. 1 / 2006, p. 117-146.
 Hélène Cavalié née d'Escayrac-Lauture, Pierre Germain dit le Romain (1703-1783). Vie d'un orfèvre et de son entourage, Paris, 2007, thèse de l'École des Chartes, volumes I, pp. 209, 210, 345, 350, 429, 447.
 F. By, « Famille van Dievoet : Artistes, de père en fils », in Le Vif/L'Express numéro spécial Bruxelles : la saga des grandes familles, 26th year n°47 (Le Vif) and n°2993 (L'Express), 21–27 November 2008, p. 121.
 Stéphane Castelluccio (éd.), Le commerce du luxe à Paris aux xviie et xviiie siècles, échanges nationaux et internationaux, Paris, Peter Lang, 2009, p. 241.
 Paul Micio, Les Collections de Monsieur frère de Louis XIV, Paris : Somogy éditions d'art, 2014, p. 47, note 169 et p. 321.

French noble families
Noble families
History of Paris